Elvinas Jankevičius is a Lithuanian politician. He served as Minister of Justice in the cabinet of Prime Minister Saulius Skvernelis from 15 May 2018 to 11 December 2020.

References 

Living people
Year of birth missing (living people)
Place of birth missing (living people)
21st-century Lithuanian politicians
Ministers of Justice of Lithuania